Mojca Sagmeister (born 6 March 1996 in Slovenj Gradec) is a Slovenian swimmer. She competed at the 2012 Summer Olympics in the Women's 400 metre freestyle, finishing 32nd in the heats, failing to qualify for the final.

References

Slovenian female swimmers
1996 births
Living people
Olympic swimmers of Slovenia
Swimmers at the 2012 Summer Olympics
European Aquatics Championships medalists in swimming
Sportspeople from Slovenj Gradec

Mediterranean Games silver medalists for Slovenia
Mediterranean Games bronze medalists for Slovenia
Swimmers at the 2013 Mediterranean Games
Mediterranean Games medalists in swimming
Slovenian female freestyle swimmers